Gwili may refer to:

River Gwili, Wales
Gwili Railway, a Welsh heritage railway
John Jenkins (Gwili) (1872-1936), Welsh poet and theologian with the bardic name Gwili
Gwili Andre (1907–1959), Danish model and actress